Chelsea Lin Jarvis ( Duncan; born March 11, 1992) is a Canadian curler from Whitehorse, Yukon. She currently plays third on Team Hailey Birnie. She was the longtime third for Sarah Koltun in her junior career.

Career

Juniors
At just 13 years old, Jarvis's first national championship was at the 2007 Canadian Junior Curling Championships where she played third for Sarah Koltun. Her team finished last with a 1–11 record. Later that year, the team finished 1–5 at the 2007 Canada Winter Games. She also played third for Koltun at the next six Canadian Junior Curling Championships. Their best result was in 2013, where they went 7–4 before losing in a tiebreaker. Other notable results were a 6–6 record in 2011 and a 5–7 finish in 2009. She competed at two Arctic Winter Games in 2008 and 2010 winning a gold medal in 2010 and a silver medal in 2008. Jarvis also competed for the University of Alberta at the U Sports/Curling Canada University Curling Championships in 2011 and 2012 as the alternate for the team. They finished 4–3 in 2011 and 4–4 in 2012.

Women's
Jarvis got to represent Yukon/Northwest Territories at the 2014 Scotties Tournament of Hearts as they had previously won the 2014 NWT/Yukon Scotties Tournament of Hearts. They were the first team from Yukon to win the event since 2000. At the Hearts in Montreal, Quebec, they finished last, however they were able to defeat Prince Edward Island's Kim Dolan and Saskatchewan's Stefanie Lawton. The following year, Yukon and Northwest Territories had separate entries to the national championship however due to a format change and because they placed last the previous year, they were put into a pre-qualifying tournament against Northern Ontario and Northwest Territories to determine the final spot in the main draw. They would lose both of their games and were eliminated. They would not participate in the 2016 Yukon Scotties Tournament of Hearts but returned in 2017 where they won the event by default. At the 2017 Scotties Tournament of Hearts, they managed to win their game against Nunavut however lost to both the Territories and New Brunswick and were once again eliminated. After the season, Koltun moved to the Northwest Territories to join the Kerry Galusha rink and the team disbanded.

Chelsea and her sister Jenna Duncan formed a new rink for the 2017–18 season with Kara Price, Jody Smallwood and Loralee Johnstone. The team represented Yukon at the 2018 Scotties Tournament of Hearts, where they finished 1–7. Jarvis made her fifth Hearts appearance in 2020 where she played third for Hailey Birnie. At the 2020 Scotties Tournament of Hearts, the team finished tied for last with an 0–7 record.

Mixed doubles
Jarvis competed in the 2013 Canadian Mixed Doubles Curling Trials with her partner Mitch Young. The duo qualified for the playoffs with a 6–1 record, before losing in the round of 12.

Personal life
Jarvis currently works as a family preservation caseworker for the Council of Yukon First Nations. She is married and has one daughter. She studied psychology at the University of Alberta. Her sister Jenna Duncan is also a curler.

Teams

References

External links

1992 births
Living people
Curlers from Yukon
Canadian women curlers
Sportspeople from Whitehorse
University of Alberta alumni